The 1996 Washington Huskies football team was an American football team that represented the University of Washington during the 1996 NCAA Division I-A football season.  In its fourth season under head coach Jim Lambright, the team compiled a 9–3 record, finished second in the Pacific-10 Conference, and outscored its opponents 391 to 254. Running back Corey Dillon was selected as the team's most valuable player. Seniors Ink Aleaga, John Fiala, Dave Janoski, and Bob Sapp were the team captains.

In his only season at UW, Seattle native Dillon set the team all-time single-season records for rushing yards (1,695 yards) and touchdowns scored (24). In the first quarter against San Jose State in mid-November, he rushed for 222 yards with two touchdowns, then went 83 yards on a pass for a third touchdown, setting NCAA records for both rushing yards and all-purpose yards (305) in one quarter. Dillon did not re-enter the non-conference game as the Huskies were comfortably ahead 25–0 by the end of the first quarter on a cold and rainy afternoon; the Dawgs led 43–3 at the half and won 53–10. For the third time, he was named the Pac-10 offensive player of the week, and was a third team All-American.

Schedule

Roster

Season summary

at Arizona St

NFL draft
Three Huskies were selected in the 1997 NFL Draft, which lasted seven rounds (240 selections).

References

Washington
Washington Huskies football seasons
Washington Huskies football